Richard Mark Wood (born 5 July 1985) is an English professional footballer who plays as a defender for EFL Championship club Rotherham United and was briefly their co-caretaker manager alongside Lee Peltier following the departure of Paul Warne to Derby County.

Career

Sheffield Wednesday
Born in Ossett, West Yorkshire, Wood was a Leeds United fan and had a season ticket at Leeds, however Wood came up through the ranks at Sheffield Wednesday and started to support The Owls instead. He broke into the senior side at the end of the 2002–03 season and capped his superb performance with a goal on his full debut against Burnley. The young Wood made such an impression that he was handed a two-year deal before he completed the second year of his Academy scholarship.

He formed an impressive partnership with Graham Coughlan in the centre of defence and has put in a series of strong displays.

Wood staked his claim for a regular spot as he missed just one of the final 28 games as Wednesday clinched promotion to the Championship the previous season.

He enjoyed a lengthy run in the 2005–06 season before an untimely injury cut short his season, which also deprived him of making an appearance for the Football League Select XI against an Italian Serie B representative side. To cap of this tremendous season, he was rewarded by receiving the Rhodes Fairbanks Young player of the year award by fans of the club.

On 3 March 2007 Wood returned from his injury to make his first start for Wednesday in 11 months in a 3–2 league win against Yorkshire rivals Leeds United at Elland Road. He would go on to start in the rest of Wednesday's 11 games that season and helped them to finish the season with just one loss from 13 games – a run which almost saw the side finish in the Championship play-offs.

Prior to the 2008–09 season Wood was named joint captain alongside Steve Watson, although shortly after the season began Wood handed in a transfer request. The request was declined.

In the 2009–10 campaign, after a successful start for Wood, scoring two goals in two matches, he declined a new contract with Wednesday, and he was transfer listed on 29 October 2009.

Coventry City
On 18 November 2009, Wood signed for Coventry City on loan until January 2010, when he was then expected to sign a permanent deal. He made his debut in a 1–1 draw with Crystal Palace on 21 November 2009. He then got his first goal for the Sky Blues the following game with the equaliser against Derby County. On 6 December Wood even captained Coventry in a 1–0 loss to Scunthorpe United. After 4 starts and 1 substitute appearance, Wood made the move permanent signing on a contract till 2013 on 1 January 2010.
On 27 March 2010, Wood scored the equaliser for Coventry in a match against his former club, Sheffield Wednesday. He was also named as captain in this game which finished 1–1.

Charlton Athletic
On 18 July 2013, Wood signed a one-year deal with Charlton Athletic.

Rotherham United
On 26 June 2014, Wood signed with Rotherham United. On 20 February 2015, Wood signed a one-month loan deal with Crawley Town.

On 23 September 2015, Wood signed a one-month loan deal with Fleetwood Town.

On 26 October 2015, he signed for Chesterfield on a three-month loan deal.

Wood scored his first goal after his return to Rotherham in a 3–1 defeat to Preston North End on 5 November 2016 and has been with the club ever since. 

Following the departure of Paul Warne as Rotherham United's manager in September 2022, Wood was installed as caretaker manager along with Lee Peltier as the club searched for a permanent option. The duo of Wood and Peltier oversaw one game as co-caretakers, a 2-0 home loss to Wigan Athletic, before the appointment of Matt Taylor from Exeter City.

International career
While playing for Sheffield Wednesday, Wood received a call up from the England national under-21 football team however injury prevented him from meeting up with the squad.

Personal life
His younger brother, Nick Wood, played in the Sheffield Wednesday academy until the end of the 2009–10 season. He subsequently played a few games for Tranmere Rovers and Mansfield Town.

Career statistics

Honours
Rotherham United
League One runner-up: 2021–22; play-offs: 2018
EFL Trophy: 2021–22

References

External links 
 

1985 births
Living people
People from Ossett
Footballers from West Yorkshire
English footballers
Association football defenders
Sheffield Wednesday F.C. players
Coventry City F.C. players
Charlton Athletic F.C. players
Rotherham United F.C. players
Crawley Town F.C. players
Fleetwood Town F.C. players
Chesterfield F.C. players
English Football League players
Rotherham United F.C. managers
English Football League managers